Fernando Monje Vicario (born 7 March 1993) is a former Spanish racing driver who competed in the World Touring Car Championship.

Career

Early career
Monje was born in Barcelona. He began his career in karting in 2005 at the age of twelve and competed in karting until 2009.

He switched to single-seaters in 2009 at the age of 16 when he debuted in the Formul'Academy Euro Series, finishing tenth in the drivers' championship. He also contested three rounds of the Spanish SEAT León Supercopa with SUNRED Engineering. For 2010, he graduated to the European F3 Open Championship with De Villota Motorsport and finished the season in sixth position. He remained in the series in 2011, but switched to the Drivex team. He ultimately finished the season in fifteenth position.

World Touring Car Championship

SUNRED and Tuenti Racing (2012)
In 2012 Monje revived his SUNRED cooperation to compete in the World Touring Car Championship. He also competed in the European Touring Car Cup, finishing the season as overall champion. Having finished the European Touring Car Cup, he returned to the WTCC, for the remainder of 2012, to drive a SEAT León WTCC for the Tuenti Racing Team. In the first race of his return at the Race of Brazil, Monje secured his first point by finishing tenth in race one. He was involved in a pileup at the start of race one at the Race of the United States, and along with Aleksei Dudukalo and Alberto Cerqui was forced to retire. Early on in the second race he crashed and his car was left near the apex of turn five for the rest of the race. He got his second point of the season in the season finale at Macau, finishing tenth once again. His two points meant he finished 24th in the championship having participated in half the races.

Campos Racing (2013–)
Monje joined new team Campos Racing for the 2013 season, racing alongside Hugo Valente. He started on pole position for race two of the Race of Morocco but dropped out of the race on the second lap after a collision with James Thompson. After the race he was given a five–place grid penalty for the Race of Slovakia having been deemed responsible for the collision.

Racing record

Career summary

Complete World Touring Car Championship results
(key) (Races in bold indicate pole position) (Races in italics indicate fastest lap)

Complete TCR International Series results
(key) (Races in bold indicate pole position) (Races in italics indicate fastest lap)

† Driver did not finish the race, but was classified as he completed over 90% of the race distance.

References

External links
 
 
 

1993 births
Living people
Racing drivers from Barcelona
Spanish racing drivers
Euroformula Open Championship drivers
European Touring Car Cup drivers
World Touring Car Championship drivers
International GT Open drivers
TCR International Series drivers
Campos Racing drivers
Auto Sport Academy drivers
Drivex drivers
Teo Martín Motorsport drivers
De Villota Motorsport drivers